Giovanni Marradi (born 1952) is a composer, pianist, arranger and television presenter. He is the son of Italian trumpeter and conductor Alfredo Marradi; his great-grandfather, also named Giovanni Marradi, was a poet and composer.

Giovanni began playing piano at age five, and three years later was sent to study composition and technique with Michael Cheskinov at the Russian Conservatory. As a young adult, he played throughout Europe and the Middle East, but his dream was to come to the U.S. to pursue his music career. After arriving in California as an Italian immigrant, Giovanni played small concerts in Southern California and was asked to perform at Caesar's Palace in Las Vegas.
Giovanni became one of the most successful expressionist pianists of our time, as well as a composer, arranger, recording artist, inventor and illustrator. Among his accomplishments, he sold 120,000 CDs in one two-hour segment on the QVC shopping channel. Another record that still stands as one of his outstanding achievements in the music industry is selling over four million CDs during his appearances on QVC and the Home Shopping Network.

Giovanni produced, directed and hosted Giovanni's World of Music, a 28-episode television music series broadcast on stations around the world and distributed by Warner Brothers Television. Both the series and Giovanni himself have been nominated for and received several awards from the National Academy of Television Arts and Sciences, the Telly Awards, EMA and the New York Festivals. His concert specials on PBS are still being aired. Giovanni has recorded over 130 CDs and two DVDs from his televised specials.

In 1995, he formed his own label, NewCastle Records. He released over 60 titles with NewCastle before signing with Atlantic Records in 1998, making his label debut, Destiny.

Giovanni's album Because I Love You won Best New Age CD of the year in Spain for 2010. In November 2015, he performed a sold-out concert in Beijing, China at the Great Hall of the People to rave reviews. Giovanni's concert at the Great Hall drew much attention and he recently returned to China for a twenty city concert tour while giving Master Classes for the children in every city on the tour during Feb/March 2019.
  Giovanni currently resides in the Summerlin area of Las Vegas, NV. He lives with his young girlfriend of nine years, Jaelle Christine and their young son. Jaelle a singer/songwriter/entertainer in her own right and may perform with Giovanni in the future.

Discography (partial)
 1992 - Boleros 
 1992 - Boleros - Vol.II 
 1992 - Broadway Themes 
 1992 - Promises 
 1993 - Secrets 
 1993 - Giovanni Plays The Beatles Love Songs (2 CDs) 
 1993 - Piano Masterpieces 
 1993 - What If 
 1995 - Come Back To Me 
 1995 - Serenity 
 1995 - Together 
 1996 - Passion  
 1997 - Always  
 1997 - Christmas With Giovanni (Vol.1) 
 1997 - Feelings 
 1997 - Homenaje A Julio Iglesias 
 1997 - Music From The World
 1997 - Music From The World - Vol.II 
 1998 - Always & Forever
 1998 - Falling In Love
 1998 - Destiny
 1999 - Classic Nights 
 1999 - Eternally 
 1999 - Gracefully
 1999 - Latin Lovers
 1999 - Lover's Rendezvous (3 CDs) 
 1999 - Romantically Yours
 1999 - The Best of Giovanni (2 CDs) 
 2000 - Around The World Vol.1 
 2000 - Around The World - Vol.2 
 2000 - Around The World Vol.3
 2000 - Broadway Romance 
 2000 - My Valentine (2 CDs) 
 2001 - Remember When
 2002 - Alone 
 2002 - Cinema Romance 
 2002 - Classical Moods 
 2002 - Colors Of Music 
 2002 - Destiny 
 2002 - Dreams 
 2002 - Dreams Nature & Music 
 2002 - Forever
 2002 - Mystique 
 2002 - Moonlight Sonata
 2002 - Mountain Breeze
 2002 - Nocturnes
 2002 - Romantique
 2002 - The Way We Were
 2002 - Treasures Of Time
 2003 - Live From Las Vegas
 2004 - Favorite Love Songs - Vol.1
 2004 - Favorite Love Songs - Vol.2 
 2004 - Favorite Love Songs - Vol.3
 2004 - For You 
 2004 - Return To Me
 2005 - French Classics
 2005 - Love Letters
 2005 - Passionate Piano
 2005 - Winter Moods
 2006 - Italian Love Songs
 2007 - Latin Moods 
 2007 - Television Classics 
 2008 - Romantico
 2008 - The Best of Giovanni (3 CDs) 
 2010 - Because I Love You 
 2010 - Christmas Classics - Vol.1 
 2010 - Christmas Classics - Vol.2 
 2010 - Christmas Classics - Vol.3 
 2010 - Gift of Love 
 2010 - Gift of Christmas - Vol.1 
 2010 - Gift of Christmas - Vol.2 
 2010 - Gift of Christmas - Vol.3 
 2010 - Have a Romantic Christmas 
 2010 - Have a Romantic Christmas - Vol.2 
 2010 - Joy of Christmas 1
 2010 - Joy of Christmas 2 
 2010 - Joy of Christmas 3 
 2010 - Merry Christmas 1 
 2010 - Merry Christmas 2 
 2010 - Merry Christmas 3 
 2010 - Romantico
 2010 - Softly 
 2011 - The Giovanni Holiday Collection - A Merry, Merry Christmas To You! 
 2012 - Solo Piano - Broadway Themes II
 2012 - Sospiro
 2012 - Because I Love You

DVDs
 2004 - Giovanni Live From Las Vegas
 2006 - Timeless

References

External links
 [ Giovanni Marradi at Allmusic]
 Official site (giovanni.com)

Italian emigrants to the United States
American television personalities
New-age pianists
Living people
1952 births
21st-century pianists